Kevin Rene Cadogan (born August 14, 1970) is an American musician, singer, songwriter, record producer, and guitarist. A founding member of the band Third Eye Blind, he performed with the band from 1993 to 2000. He co-wrote some of Third Eye Blind's most notable hits, including "How's It Going to Be", "Losing a Whole Year", and "Graduate", 10 of the 14 songs on their debut album Third Eye Blind as well as six of the 13 tracks on his final collaboration with the band in their second album Blue.

Cadogan and Stephan Jenkins signed a recording contract with Elektra Records in May 1996 which was later reported as the largest recording deal ever for an unsigned artist and launched Third Eye Blind into stardom. In 2011, Cadogan was honored on the show Pensado's Place by record producer Eric Valentine.

Personal life
Born in Oakland, California, Cadogan spent two years in England as a child, while his father taught on sabbatical. Later, the family returned to the United States and settled in Berkeley, California. The Cadogan family maintains their Irish heritage, and Cadogan holds dual American and Irish citizenship. Cadogan's song "Waiting For Me" refers to his close ties to Ireland.

Cadogan attended Berkeley public schools up to his graduation in 1988. Cadogan later attended San Francisco State University, graduating in 1993 with a Bachelor of Arts degree in broadcast communications.

Kevin Cadogan lives with his wife and three children in Berkeley.

Third Eye Blind
Cadogan began learning the guitar at age 12 and began playing in bands shortly after. Like many other guitarists in the Bay Area, Cadogan was a student of guitar virtuoso Joe Satriani. Cadogan was introduced to Stephan Jenkins, who would become his songwriting partner in Third Eye Blind, at a concert in San Francisco in 1993. The two began jamming together before starting to perform as Third Eye Blind in shows around the Bay Area. Cadogan won two California Music Awards for best songwriter along with bandmate Jenkins and was nominated three years in a row as best guitarist in California along with Kirk Hammett from Metallica and Tom Morello of Rage Against the Machine.

According to a NY Times interview with Kevin Cadogan, it was his understanding that Third Eye Blind was an equal partnership.

Having signed to Elektra Records in 1996, the band released their self-titled debut album the following year. Cadogan co-wrote ten of the 14 songs on the album. The album spawned a number of Billboard Top 10 singles, and the album has sold in excess of six million copies to date. Cadogan was awarded, along with Jenkins, the award for best songwriter at the 1998 California Music Awards.

Cadogan co-wrote 6 of the 13 songs on Third Eye Blind's second album, Blue. Subsequently, Cadogan was awarded, along with Jenkins, the award for best songwriter at the 2000 California Music Awards.

Departure from Third Eye Blind
Cadogan and Third Eye Blind parted ways in January 2000.

According to Cadogan, he was ousted without warning because he did not agree to a deal that would have yielded a $1 million advance to record an EP and start an Elektra Records imprint for which Stephan Jenkins would have full ownership and control.

The controversial circumstances of Cadogan's departure stem from his allegations that Jenkins and he were to be partners of the corporation named Third Eye Blind Inc. Instead, Jenkins directed the band's manager Eric Godtland and the band's attorney Thomas Mandelbaum to issue Jenkins 100% of the shares to himself, making him the sole owner of all Third Eye Blind assets. Cadogan claimed that he was told by the band's attorney that shares had not been issued to anyone. Cadogan told the New York Times in 1999 that he discovered 100% of the shares had in fact been issued to Jenkins as far back as 1996 when Cadogan and Jenkins signed the definitive record contract with Elektra. Cadogan states that upon learning that Jenkins owned 100% of the band he then refused to sign off on any more recording contracts and loans until shares were also issued to him. In 1999 Cadogan was asked to sign a $1 million loan from Elektra Records which would allow Third Eye Blind to record an EP and release it on its own label as a subsidiary of Elektra. Cadogan refused to sign the deal, citing the fact that he would not own or have any control over the assets acquired from the deal. In November 1999 Elektra Records issued the funds to the Third Eye Blind corporation without Cadogan's signature as Elektra had previously required. Two months later in January 2000, Cadogan and Third Eye Blind parted ways after a concert in Utah. Despite having received the $1 million from Elektra in 1999, the band never delivered the EP for which the funds were allocated. Cadogan filed suit, alleging wrongful termination, adding that his production, recording, and songwriter royalties were withheld since being kicked out of the band. The lawsuit was settled out of court in June 2002, with the terms of the settlement undisclosed.

A major point of contention between Cadogan and Jenkins was an original understanding that they were to be equal partners in Third Eye Blind, but Jenkins established Third Eye Blind Inc. on the eve of signing the band's original record deal with Elektra Records in 1996. All payments were subsequently directed in the record contract to be paid to Third Eye Blind Inc., effectively cutting Cadogan out of any partnership and making Jenkins the sole "owner" of the band. Cadogan says he was unaware that this change had been made in the contract.

In 2006 Third Eye Blind released A Collection on Rhino Records. The collection included songs that were co-written by Cadogan from the first two albums. Cadogan was omitted from the band's history in the biography section of the liner notes, and credit for his work was falsely given to his replacement guitarist, Tony Fredianelli. Jude Gold from Guitar Player magazine wrote in his review of the album that omitting Cadogan from the band's history is "like saying Guns N Roses music always profited from the interplay between Axl Rose and guitarist Buckethead".

New bands and solo career
Cadogan released three solo albums titled Wunderfoot, 12 Nights in Studio A, and Thousand Yard Stare.

In April 2007 Cadogan, Steve Harwell of Smash Mouth and Eric Stock of Stroke 9 formed a band Radio Angel. Eric Valentine agreed to be a producer of their music. They have not performed together since May 2014, but did release two singles, "Come Together" and "Never Turn You Down."

Cadogan made a guest appearance on a recording of Third Eye Blind closing track "God of Wine" with Lovedrug for the band's fan-chosen covers album from the I Am Lovedrug campaign. The album, titled Best of I Am Lovedrug was released June 28, 2011.

On December 19, 2011, Cadogan and original Third Eye Blind bassist Arion Salazar reunited to perform on the television program Backline. Cadogan, Salazar, and Neve's John Stephens performed 12 of their original Third Eye Blind compositions under the new band name "XEB". While audio recordings of the performance have surfaced through the band's social media sites, the broadcast of the performance never came to fruition. They also created a music video for "Graduate" as well as releasing a single titled "Out of My Mind", this time with Cadogan again on vocals.

In May 2013 Cadogan and brothers Collin and Chris Livingston formed the alternative rock band Seven Cinematic. Cadogan left the project shortly after its inception following an unsuccessful crowdfunding campaign to help pay for the recording of an album.

On February 1, 2016, Cadogan announced he and Salazar were forming a new band named Cadogan & Salazar. They performed a 20th anniversary concert at the Annex celebrating 20 years since the creation of Third Eye Blind's self titled debut album.

In October 2016, Cadogan & Salazar reverted to the name "XEB" when former Third Eye Blind guitarist, Tony Fredianelli, joined the band as their permanent singer. A number of shows were announced, including an opening slot on a one-off show with Everclear and Tonic.

In 2017, XEB announced a 20th anniversary spring and summer tour in support of Third Eye Blind's debut album.

Discography
With Third Eye Blind
 Third Eye Blind (1997)
 Blue (1999)

With Bully
 Bully (2002)

Solo albums
 Bully for You – as Cousin Kevin (2000)
 Coming Back from Yesterday – as Cousin Kevin (2001)
 12 Nights in Studio A (2002)
 Wunderfoot (2004)
 Thousand Yard Stare (2006)

Solo EPs
 Million Times the Sky (2008)
 All the High Castles (2017)

References

External links
 Kevin Cadogan official website

1970 births
American male singer-songwriters
American rock guitarists
American male guitarists
American rock singers
American rock songwriters
Living people
Musicians from Oakland, California
Third Eye Blind members
Berkeley High School (Berkeley, California) alumni
Singer-songwriters from California
Guitarists from California
21st-century American guitarists
21st-century American male singers
21st-century American singers